Pterostylis pusilla, commonly known as the tiny rustyhood is a plant in the orchid family Orchidaceae and is endemic to southern Australia. It has a rosette of leaves and up to nine relatively small green and reddish-brown flowers with translucent white "windows" and a  dark brown, insect-like labellum.

Description
Pterostylis pusilla is a terrestrial,  perennial, deciduous, herb with an underground tuber. There are between two and four stem leaves with their bases wrapped around the flowering stem. The "head" end has many short hairs and there are between two and four longer hairs on each side of the body. Flowering occurs from September to October.

Taxonomy and naming
Pterostylis pusilla was first formally described in 1918 by Richard Rogers from specimens sent to him from South Australia and Victoria. The description was published in Transactions and Proceedings of the Royal Society of South Australia. The specific epithet (pusilla) is a Latin word meaning "very little", "small", "petty", "puny" or "insignificant".

Distribution and habitat
The tiny rustyhood usually grows in leaf litter in open forest or mallee scrub in stony soil.

References

pusilla
Endemic orchids of Australia
Orchids of New South Wales
Orchids of South Australia
Orchids of Victoria (Australia)
Plants described in 1918